The 2014–15 season was the 92nd season in Elche’s history and the 21st in the top-tier.

Squad

Out on loan

Transfers

Summer

 

In:

 
 
 

 

Out:

Winter

 

In:

Out:

Competitions

La Liga

League table

Results summary

Results by round

Results

Copa del Rey

Statistics

Appearances and goals
Updated as of 30 May 2015.

|}

Disciplinary record

References

Elche CF seasons
Elche CF